Dorin Munteanu (born 6 March 1946) is a Romanian alpine skier. He competed in three events at the 1968 Winter Olympics.

References

1946 births
Living people
Romanian male alpine skiers
Olympic alpine skiers of Romania
Alpine skiers at the 1968 Winter Olympics
People from Brașov County